The 1981 EuroHockey Club Champions Cup, taking place in Brussels, was the eighth edition of Europe's premier field hockey club competition. It was the first edition were two divisions were established. Otherwise, the competition format established in 1977 was preserved.

It was won by HC Klein Zwitserland in a final match against SKA Sverdlovsk, which was the revelation of the competition considering Soviet hockey, represented by Dynamo Almaty, had failed to rank among the top 8 clubs in previous editions. It was the Dutch club's 2nd European Champions Cup trophy. Barcelona's Real Club de Polo attained the 3rd place by defeating defending champions Slough HC.

1st division (Brussels)

Group stage

Group A
  SKA Sverdlovsk - 5 points
  Slough HC - 3 points
  TK Frankenthal - 2 points
  FC Lione - 2 points

Group B
  HC Klein Zwitserland - 5 points
  Real Club de Polo, Barcelona - 5 points
  Uccle Sport - 2 points
  Edinburgh HC - 0 points

Play-offs

Final
 HC Klein Zwitserland 4-0 SKA Sverdlovsk

3rd place
 Real Club de Polo, Barcelona 5-2 Slough HC

5th place
 TG Frankenthal 0-0 Uccle Sport (penalty shoot-out: 8-7)

7th place
 Edinburgh HC 3-2 FC Lione

Standings
  HC Klein Zwitserland
  SKA Sverdlovsk
  Real Club de Polo, Barcelona
  Slough HC (defending champions)
  TG Frankenthal
  Uccle Sport
  Edinburgh HC
  FC Lione

  Scotland and  France are relegated to 2nd Division for the 1982 Champions Cup.

EuroHockey Club Trophy
EuroHockey Club Trophy in Rome.

Group stage

Group A
  Cookstown HC - 5 points
  Warta Poznań - 4 points
  Rock Gunners - 3 points
  HC Olten - 0 points

Group B
  HC EUR Algida - 5 points
  SV Arminen Vienna - 3 points
  HK Jedinstvo - 3 points
  Withchurch HC - 1 point

Play-offs

1st place
 Cookstown HC 1-1 HC EUR Algida (penalty shoot-out: 5-2)

3rd place
 SV Arminen Vienna 2-1 Warta Poznań

5th place
 HK Jedinstvo 3-2 Rock Gunners

7th place
 Withchurch HC 3-2 HC Olten

Standings
  Cookstown HC
  HC EUR Algida
  SV Arminen Vienna
  Warta Poznań
  HK Jedinstvo
  Rock Gunners
  Withchurch HC
  HC Olten

 Ireland and Italy are promoted to 1st Division for the 1982 Champions Cup.

See also
European Hockey Federation

References

EuroHockey Club Champions Cup
International field hockey competitions hosted by Belgium
International field hockey competitions hosted by Italy
EuroHockey Club Champions Cup
EuroHockey Club Champions Cup
EuroHockey Club Champions Cup